The 1991 Missouri Valley Conference men's soccer season was the 1st season of men's varsity soccer in the conference.

The 1991 Missouri Valley Conference Men's Soccer Tournament was hosted and won by Tulsa.

Teams

MVC Tournament

See also 

 Missouri Valley Conference
 Missouri Valley Conference men's soccer tournament
 1991 NCAA Division I men's soccer season
 1991 in American soccer

References 

Missouri Valley Conference
1991 NCAA Division I men's soccer season